The Church of the Nativity of the Blessed Virgin Mary is the parish church of Lympstone in Devon, England. It is a Grade II* listed building.

History

There has been a church on the site since at least 1329. It was largely rebuilt from 1864 to 1867.

References

External links
Official website

Church of England church buildings in Devon
Grade II* listed churches in Devon